Xokleng or Laklãnõ is a Southern Jê language (Jê, Macro-Jê) spoken by the Xokleng people of Brazil. It is closely related to Kaingang.

Names
Alternate names are Socré, Chocré, Xocren, Bugre, Botocudo, Aweicoma, Cauuba, Caahans, Caagua, Caaigua.

References

External links 
 Collections in the Archive of the Indigenous Languages of Latin America

Jê languages
Languages of Brazil